The Battle of Dafei River was fought in mid-670 between the forces of the Tang dynasty and the Tibetan Empire, for control over the Tarim Basin (the "Anxi Protectorate" in Chinese parlance). In 669, the Tibetan Empire invaded and conquered the Tuyuhun kingdom of Qinghai, which was a tributary state and important ally to the Tang dynasty. To help Tuyuhun restore the regime, Emperor Gaozong of Tang launched the campaign against Tibet. The Tang general, Xue Rengui, commanded an army of 50,000 men against 400,000 men of the Tibetan Empire. He left his slower-moving baggage train and 20,000 soldiers under Guo Daifeng behind and advanced with the rest to the Qinghai Lake. The Tibetans attacked and captured the Tang baggage train, and fought Xue's own army at the Dafei River (Dafeichuan, 大非川). In the aftermath of the battle, Xue retreated from Tuyuhun. However, the Tibetan Empire lost 100,000 men and the weakened Tibetan Empire went into decline in the following decades.

See also
Sino-Tibetan relations during the Tang dynasty

References 
 
 

Dafei River
Dafei River
Dafei
670
Tang–Tibet relations